Kingston, or Sasscer's House, is a -story historic home located at Upper Marlboro, Prince George's County, Maryland, United States. It is believed to be the oldest building remaining in the town of Upper Marlboro and may have been built, at least in part, before 1730. Many alterations and additions were made to it in the Victorian era, including "gingerbread" details typical of this era. The Craufurd family cemetery is located in the woods northwest of the house.

Kingston was listed on the National Register of Historic Places in 1978.  It is located in the Upper Marlboro Residential Historic District.

References

External links
, including photo in 1973, at Maryland Historical Trust website

Houses completed in 1730
Houses in Prince George's County, Maryland
Houses on the National Register of Historic Places in Maryland
Historic American Buildings Survey in Maryland
National Register of Historic Places in Prince George's County, Maryland
Individually listed contributing properties to historic districts on the National Register in Maryland